Mary Louisa Kirschner (7 January 1852 – 30 June 1931) was a painter and glass artist.

Biography
Kirschner was born in Prague and first trained in Vienna with Anton Hansch and later with Adolf Heinrich Lier, under whom she showed her first works in Munich in 1871. In 1873 she began making copies after Jules Dupré and that winter her family moved to Paris, where she met him in person. When he saw her copies, he said "Jamais je n'ai été copié comme cela. J'aurais pu m'y trompera moi-même." She was accepted as his only pupil. She returned to her family's home in the Czech countryside where she painted Polish oxen that were favorably received in London in the Aquarium, Westminster in 1876.

From 1887 Marie Kirschner lived with her younger sister Aloisia Kirschner in Berlin, but spent the summers in Bohemia. She was a member of the Berlin Lyceum Club. In Prague, she also belonged to the American Progressive League.  Her acquaintances included Zdenka Braunerová.

In later life she became a glass artist, working mostly in the Jugendstil style.

Kirschner remained unmarried like her sister Aloisia. She died in Košátky. She was buried in the family grave at Malvazinky cemetery in Prague.

See also
 List of German women artists

References

Marie Luise Kirschner on artnet

Content in this article is translated from the existing German Wikipedia article at :de:Marie Kirschner

1852 births
1931 deaths
Artists from Prague
Czech painters
German women painters
19th-century German painters
20th-century German painters
19th-century women artists
20th-century German women artists
Czech women artists